Binnelanders (previously Binneland and Binneland Sub Judice) is a South African Afrikaans soap opera. It is set in and around the fictional private hospital, Binneland Kliniek, in Pretoria, and the storyline follows the trials, trauma and tribulations of the staff and patients of the hospital. The series is produced by Friedrich and Elsje Stark of Stark Productions. Binnelanders is currently airing season 16.

Production history

Binnelanders began as a weekly one-hour drama, the first episode of which was broadcast only in Afrikaans on 13 October 2005 on both M-Net and kykNET. Halfway through the show's second season, it became a daily half-hour soap opera, and English subtitles were introduced. It was broadcast directly after Egoli on M-Net in the 18:30 time slot. Programming shifted to the 18:00 timeslot in preparation for the conclusion of Egoli, after which Binnelanders would extend over a one-hour period, consuming both time slots. The title of the show was changed to Binneland Sub Judice, and a new legal firm, Rossouw, Paulse and Knight Incorporated (RPK), was added to the storyline, along with new characters. For the seventh season, the show was again renamed, this time to simply Binneland. The legal angle of the series was dropped, and the show was reverted to a half-hour time slot. Binneland was removed from M-Net in early 2011 and the name was changed back to Binnelanders and is now broadcast exclusively on kykNET, weekdays 19:30.

Opening sequence

The theme song used in Binnelanders was written and performed by Afrikaans artist Jak de Priester. The title sequence was changed for Sub Judice, but later reverted to the original, with a few modifications.

Main cast

The main cast as of 06/07/21 is as follows:
 Hykie Berg as Dr. Conrad Bester
 Clint Brink as Dr. Steve Abrahams
 Reynard Hugo as Dr. Tertius Jonker
 Hans Strydom as Dr. At Koster
 Cindy Swanepoel as Dr. Annelize Roux
 Je-ani Swiegelaar as Naomi Koster
 Germandt Geldenhuys as Louis Koster
 Hannelie Warren as Ilse Ferreira
 Caiden Bouwer as Ruan de Beer

References

2005 South African television series debuts
Afrikaans-language television shows
Mass media in Pretoria
Medical television series
South African television soap operas
2000s South African television series
2010s South African television series